The 2017 Pepe Reyes Cup was played on 24 September 2017 at Victoria Stadium in Gibraltar.
This was the 17th Pepe Reyes Cup and was played by Lincoln Red Imps, runners-up of the 2016–17 Gibraltar Premier Division and the 2017 Rock Cup, and Europa, winners of the 2016–17 Gibraltar Premier Division and the 2017 Rock Cup. Lincoln Red Imps won 3–1 on penalties.

Route to the final
Europa's Double meant Lincoln Red Imps qualified after they finished second in the 2016–17 Gibraltar Premier Division.

Match details

References

1
2017–18 in European football
2017 in association football
Pepe Reyes Cup 2017
Pepe Reyes Cup 2017
Pepe Reyes Cup 2017